George Ching-Hung Kuo is a Taiwanese-born scientist, who along with Michael Houghton, Qui-Lim Choo and Daniel W. Bradley, co-discovered and cloned the hepatitis C virus in 1989.

Kuo graduated from the National Taiwan University in 1961 and completed his PhD in molecular biology at the Albert Einstein College of Medicine in 1972.

Following the discovery of Hepatitis C at Chiron Corporation, Kuo, who was working in a lab next door to Michael Houghton's, designed a test that could screen blood for the infection, and in 1988 Hirohito was the first person to receive blood that had been screened by Kuo's method. The United States would go on to license the testing technique in 1990. The development of diagnostic reagents to detect HCV in blood supplies has reduced the risk of acquiring HCV through blood transfusion from one in three to about one in two million.

He was awarded the Karl Landsteiner Memorial Award (1992) and Dale A. Smith Memorial Award (2005) of the American Association of Blood Banks, and the William Beaumont Prize of the American Gastroenterological Association in 1994.

Personal life 
His wife is Carol Lan-Fang Kuo, who also worked for the Chiron Corporation in Emeryville, California. Together they worked on developing vaccines and blood-testing procedures for hepatitis C. They have a daughter, Irene Carol, a graduate of the Massachusetts Institute of Technology and the University of California, San Francisco, an associate professor of ophthalmology at Johns Hopkins School of Medicine in Baltimore, and a specialist in cornea and refractive surgery at the Wilmer Eye Institute.

References

Year of birth missing (living people)
Living people
National Taiwan University alumni
Albert Einstein College of Medicine alumni
Taiwanese virologists